This is a list of ASCII printing characters other than letters and digits. There are 33 characters classified as ASCII Punctuation & Symbols are also sometimes referred to as ASCII special characters. Often when a web site specifies that "punctuation" is allowed (or needed) in a password, it means these characters, and not any other Unicode characters.

References

 Unicode 7.0 Character Code Charts, Unicode, Inc.

Characters
Unicode